Kirovskaya is a station on the First Line of the Samara Metro. It opened on 26 December 1987. It is in the Sovetsky district of Samara. The station's name comes from the street on which the station is situated, Prospekt Kirova, which is named for Bolshevik leader Sergey Kirov.

Path sistem 
After this station the trains towards Yungorodok goes from mains tracks to branch to "TCH-1 "Kirovskoe". The main tracks follow to the dead end, that soon going to be part of tunnel to the "Krilya Sovietov" station

References

External links
 Official station page

Samara Metro stations
Railway stations in Russia opened in 1987
Railway stations located underground in Russia